Auisle or Óisle (  or  ; died c. 867) was a Viking leader in Ireland and Scotland in the mid-late ninth century. He was the son of the king of Lochlann, identified in the non-contemporary Fragmentary Annals of Ireland as Gofraid, and brother of Amlaíb Conung and Ímar, the latter of whom founded the Uí Ímair dynasty, and whose descendants would go on to dominate the Irish Sea region for several centuries. Another Viking leader, Halfdan Ragnarsson, is sometimes considered a brother. The Irish Annals title Auisle, Ímar and Amlaíb "kings of the foreigners". Modern scholars use the  title "kings of Dublin" after the Viking settlement which formed the base of their power.

Auisle is mentioned three times in contemporary annals. In the first entry, dated 863, he and his brothers are recorded as having raided Brega, including underground tombs at Achad Aldai, Cnodba, and Dubad. The second, dated 866, records  Auisle and Amlaíb raiding Pictland, taking away many hostages. In the final entry, dated 867, the death of Auisle at the hands of unnamed kinsmen is reported. According to the later Fragmentary Annals his brothers Amlaíb and Ímar plotted his death, with Amlaíb striking the killing blow.

Background

The earliest recorded Viking raids in Ireland occurred in 795. Over time, these raids increased in intensity, and they overwintered in Ireland for the first time in 840–841. Later in 841 a longphort was constructed at Áth Cliath (Irish for hurdled ford), a site which would later develop into the city of Dublin. Longphorts were also established at other sites around Ireland, some of which developed into larger Viking settlements over time. The Viking population in Ireland was boosted in 851 with the arrival of a large group known as "dark foreigners" – a contentious term usually considered to mean the newly arrived Vikings, as opposed to the "fair foreigners", i.e.  the Viking population which was resident prior to this influx. A kingdom in Viking Scotland was established by the mid ninth-century, and it exerted control over some of the Vikings in Ireland. By 853 a separate kingdom of Dublin had been set up which claimed control over all the Vikings in Ireland.

Auisle's brother Amlaíb arrived in Ireland in 853 according to the Annals of Ulster:

Amlaíb is named in the annals as a "king of the foreigners", but in modern texts he is usually labelled the first king of Dublin, after the Viking settlement which was the base of his power. His brothers arrived in Ireland later, and they ruled together as co-kings. The Fragmentary Annals go into more detail regarding Amlaíb's arrival:

Lochlann, originally Laithlinn or Lothlend, the land where Amlaíb's father was king, is often identified with Norway, but it is not universally accepted that it had such a meaning in early times. Several historians have proposed instead that in early times, and certainly as late as the Battle of Clontarf in 1014, Laithlinn refers to the Norse and Norse-Gael lands in the Hebrides, the Isle of Man, the Northern Isles and parts of mainland Scotland. Whatever the original sense, by the twelfth century, when Magnus Barefoot undertook his expedition to the West, it had come to mean Norway.

Biography

Auisle is first mentioned by the Irish Annals in 863:

Prior to this raid, Auisle's brother Amlaíb had been involved in a protracted war with Máel Sechnaill, overking of the Southern Uí Néill, and a group of Vikings sometimes known as the Norse-Irish. Máel Sechnaill was the most powerful king in Ireland at the time and his lands lay close to the Viking settlement of Dublin. Máel Sechnaill died in 862, and his territory in Meath was split between two rulers, Lorcán mac Cathail and Conchobar mac Donnchada. The raids on various underground tombs in Brega mentioned by the annals in 863 were likely an attempt to increase the influence of the Vikings of Dublin. Muirecán mac Diarmata, overking of the Uí Dúnchada, was killed by Vikings in 863, probably by Auisle and his kin trying to expand into Leinster.

Beginning around 864 the three brothers halted their campaigns of conquest in Ireland, and instead campaigned in Britain. Ímar disappears from the Irish Annals in 864, and does not reappear until 870. This has led some scholars to conclude he is identical to Ivar the Boneless, a Viking leader who was active in England during this period as a commander of the Great Heathen Army. In 866 Amlaíb and Auisle led a large army to Pictland and raided much of the country, taking away many hostages.

Auisle is mentioned for the third and final time by contemporary annals in 867. The Annals of Ulster relate his death:

The Fragmentary Annals state explicitly that Amlaíb and Ímar were responsible for their brother's death:

Family

Auisle's father is identified as Gofraid by the Fragmentary Annals. Auisle, Amlaíb, and Ímar are identified as "kings of the foreigners" by the Annals of Ulster in 863, and as brothers by the Fragmentary Annals:

Some scholars identify Halfdan Ragnarsson as another brother. This identification is contingent upon Ímar being identical to Ivar the Boneless: Halfdan and Ivar are named as brothers in the Anglo-Saxon Chronicle. According to the Annals of Ulster Amlaíb's son Oistin was slain in battle by "Albann" in 875. This figure is generally agreed to be Halfdan. If that is correct, then it may explain the reason for the conflict: it was a dynastic squabble for control of the kingdom. One potential problem is that according to Norse tradition Ivar and Halfdan were the sons of Ragnar Lodbrok, whereas Ímar and Amlaíb are named as sons of Gofraid in the Fragmentary Annals. However, the historicity of Ragnar is uncertain and the identification of Ragnar as the father of Ivar and Halfdan is not to be relied upon.

A figure called "mac Auisli" in the original Old Irish, mentioned by the Annals of Ulster in 883 may have been a son of Auisle. The entry in the annals reads:

The much later Chronicon Scotorum says something similar, stating that it was Ottár son of Járnkné, possibly identical with Ottir Iarla, and Muirgel daughter of Máel Sechnaill mac Máele Ruanaid who arranged the killing, but no motive is given.

Family tree

Notes

References

Citations

Primary Sources
  Accessed via Internet Archive.
 
 
 
 
  Accessed via Internet Archive.

Secondary Sources
  Accessed via Internet Archive.
 
  Subscription or UK public library membership required.

External links
 CELT: Corpus of Electronic Texts at University College Cork. The Corpus of Electronic Texts includes the Annals of Ulster and the Four Masters, the Chronicon Scotorum and the Book of Leinster as well as Genealogies, and various Saints' Lives. Most are translated into English, or translations are in progress.

Rulers of Lochlann
867 deaths
9th-century Irish monarchs
Monarchs of Dublin
9th-century Irish people
Year of birth unknown